Going For Myself is a 1957 jazz album by Harry "Sweets" Edison and Lester Young, accompanied by Oscar Peterson. The album is one of Young's last studio recordings.

Track listing
"Flic" (Oscar Peterson, Lester Young) - 06:16		
"Love Is Here to Stay" (George Gershwin, Ira Gershwin) - 05:53
"St. Tropez" (Harry "Sweets" Edison, Peterson, Young) - 10:05
"Waldorf Blues" (Young) - 08:19	
"Sunday" (Chester Conn, Benny Krueger, Ned Miller, Jule Styne)	- 06:55
"You're Getting to Be a Habit with Me" (Al Dubin, Harry Warren) - 07:43

Bonus tracks on CD reissue in 2012:
Ballad medley: "A Ghost of a Chance"/"I Cover the Waterfront" (Ned Washington, Ned Young, Bing Crosby)/(Johnny Green, Edward Heyman) - 5:51
"Perdido" (Juan Tizol, Ervin Drake, Hans Lengsfelder) - 6:14
"St. Tropez" - 6:55 - Alternate take
"You're Getting to Be a Habit with Me" - 7:43 - Alternate take
"Waldorf Blues" 6:16 - Alternate take

Personnel
Lester Young - tenor saxophone, clarinet (03 & 09)
Harry "Sweets" Edison - trumpet

(Hollywood, July 31, 1957) (Tracks# 01-03, 07-09)
Oscar Peterson - piano
Herb Ellis - guitar
Ray Brown - double bass
Louie Bellson - drums

(New York, February 7, 1958) (Tracks# 04-06, 10-11)
Lou Stein - piano
Herb Ellis - guitar
Ray Brown - double bass
Mickey Sheen - drums

References

Harry Edison albums
Lester Young albums
1957 albums
Verve Records albums